Dopasia harti, Hart's glass lizard, is a species of lizard of the Anguidae family. It is found in Vietnam, China, and Taiwan.

References

Dopasia
Reptiles described in 1899
Reptiles of Vietnam
Reptiles of China
Reptiles of Taiwan
Taxa named by George Albert Boulenger